Durgachak is a town in Purba Medinipur district, West Bengal, India.

Geography

Location
It is located at an elevation of 1 m from MSL.

Police station
Durgachak police station has jurisdiction over Haldia CD Block. Durgachak police station covers an area of 44,21 km2 with a population of 71,067. Durgachak police station is located in Haldia municipality.

Urbanisation
79.19% of the population of Haldia subdivision live in the rural areas. Only 20.81% of the population live in the urban areas, and that is the highest proportion of urban population amongst the four subdivisions in Purba Medinipur district.

Note: The map alongside presents some of the notable locations in the subdivision. All places marked in the map are linked in the larger full screen map.

Places of interest
 Balughata
 Gopaljew Temple
 Shiva Mandir
 Township Riverside
 Patikhali Riverside

Transport

Durgachak railway station and Durgachak Town railway station are situated on the Panskura-Haldia line.

References

External links
 About Durgachak
 

Neighbourhoods in Haldia